Reginald McKnight (born 26 February 1956) is an American short story writer and novelist.

Life
McKnight was born 26 February 1956 in Fürstenfeldbruck, Germany, to an Air Force family; therefore, he moved around a lot in childhood, although he calls Colorado home. He earned degrees from Pikes Peak Community College (A.A.), Colorado College (B.A.) and University of Denver (M.A.); he is also Phi Beta Kappa and received an honorary doctorate from Colorado College.

As a teacher, McKnight has been a professor of English at the University of Maryland, College Park, Carnegie Mellon University, and the University of Michigan, Ann Arbor. He also taught at the University of Pittsburgh, but left when he learned that other faculty told racist jokes about black people when he wasn't in their presence.  As of 2002, he is the Hamilton Holmes Professor of English at the University of Georgia in Athens; he was also the first person to hold that position.

McKnight has had two extended stays in Africa, teaching English in Dakar, Senegal, from 1981 to 1982, and another in 1985 as part of a Thomas J. Watson Fellowship. He says that "he didn't truly consider himself a writer until he went to Africa", partly because that he was writing intensely for several hours a day while he was there, and also because, as he states, "when I left that place I had done something to myself in a really profound way--imprinted myself with the written word in ways that I hadn't prior to that". He also states that after a few weeks there, he became more aware of what he calls his "Africanness" by recognizing the same cadences in the voices of Senegalese women that he knew listening to his mother and his aunts growing up.

Awards
 O. Henry Award
 1988 Drue Heinz Literature Prize
 1995 Whiting Award

Works
   (reprint)

Editor

Anthologies

References

External links
Profile at The Whiting Foundation

1956 births
Living people
20th-century American novelists
21st-century American novelists
African-American novelists
American male novelists
Writers from Colorado Springs, Colorado
University of Georgia faculty
University of Michigan faculty
American male short story writers
African-American short story writers
20th-century American short story writers
21st-century American short story writers
20th-century American male writers
21st-century American male writers
Novelists from Michigan
Novelists from Colorado
Novelists from Georgia (U.S. state)
20th-century African-American writers
21st-century African-American writers
African-American male writers